The Yuk Wong Temple aka. Yuk Wong Kung Din or Yuk Wong Bo Din is a temple located at No. 26A A Kung Ngam Village Lane, A Kung Ngam, Shau Kei Wan, Hong Kong.

The temple is dedicated to the Jade Emperor (Yuk Wong in Cantonese). Two side altars are dedicated to Tin Hau (left of the main altar) and Kwun Yam (right).

The temple is managed by the Chinese Temples Committee. The interior of the temple can be explored with Google Street View.

History
In the mid 19th century, people from Huizhou and Chaozhou quarried stones in the hill for the development of the central urban area. They set up a shrine to worship Yuk Wong. At the beginning of the 20th century, the shrine was developed into a small temple and was renovated many times. The latest renovation was in 1992.

Festivals
The Jade Emperor's Birthday is celebrated at the temple starting from the night of 8th day of first lunar month (during Chinese New Year period).

See also
 Jade Emperor
 Yuanching Temple, Changhua, Taiwan
 Fengshan Tiangong Temple, Kaohsiung, Taiwan
 Jade Emperor Pagoda, Ho Chi Minh City, Vietnam
 Thni Kong Tnua, Penang, Malaysia
 Tin Hau temples in Hong Kong

References

External links

 Webpage about the temples of Shau Kei Wan, including I Yuk Wong Temple, on The Temple Trail website

Religious buildings and structures in Hong Kong